After the Disco is the second studio album by American alternative rock band Broken Bells. Recorded with the seventeen-piece Angel City String Orchestra and a four-piece choir, the album was released by Columbia Records on January 31, 2014. The album follows the band's 2013 single, "Holding On for Life", which features as the third track on the album. After the Disco was written by band members James Mercer and Brian Burton, and produced by Burton.

Recording
The album was primarily recorded by the band at Mondo Studio in Los Angeles, California. The album, which started recording in early 2012, was recorded with a four-piece choir. The album was also recorded at two secondary recording studios, Sonora Recorders, also located in Los Angeles, and Firehouse Studios, located in Pasadena, California.

Orchestral and string recordings were conducted at the Glenwood Place Studios, located in Burbank, California, with The Angel City String Orchestra. With an arrangement of eleven violins, three cellos and three violas, conducted by Daniele Luppi, the orchestra recorded music for "Leave It Alone", "The Changing Lights", "Lazy Wonderland", "The Angel and the Fool" and "The Remains of Rock and Roll". Additional musicians, respectively playing tenor saxophone, trombone and trumpet, were also recorded for the ninth track "No Matter What You're Told".

Packaging
The album cover for After the Disco, designed by Jacob Escobedo, was originally sketched by Escobedo during the early stages of the creative process for After the Disco. The initial sketches of the artwork, which reflects Psychedelic themes of the 1960s and 70s and synthetic Space art, originally inspired Mercer and Burton to take on elements of Retro-futurism in their work, which led to the band recording the album with instruments from the 60s/70s time period. James Mercer stated to Australian radio station Triple J:
"The guy who did the artwork for the first record, Jacob Escobedo, came up with that concept for the artwork [for this album], and in that moment we began talking about retro-futurism: so if you were to go back and look at the science fiction books released in the fifties and just how fascinating it is to see what people thought about the future. And for us, that kind of became like a theme. Brian's got all of this ancient gear - synthesisers from the time that synthesisers were being made - and they were incredibly futuristic at that time. And then as we got more into it ... the whole aesthetic started to evolve from there."

Promotion
After the Disco was officially unveiled by the band and Columbia Records on October 8, 2013, after much media and fan speculation. A teaser trailer for the album, sporting a January 2014 release date, was released the same day, featuring a snippet of the third track, "Holding On for Life".
The announcement of After the Disco was accompanied by a series of short films with the same title starring Kate Mara and Anton Yelchin. The album itself was released on January 31, 2014, peaking at number 5 in the Billboard 200.

Composition
Musically, Disco works in a psych-pop / space rock sound. It also looks to disco, new wave and synth-pop styles.

Reception

Critical reception
At Alternative Press, Mike Usinger rated the album four stars out of five, and felt the album was "the perfect soundtrack for the morning after" a night out hurling it up. Edna Gunderson of USA Today rated the album three-and-a-half stars out of four, writing that the band "raise their game" on the release "by simply delivering fatter hooks, juicier melodies, dreamier vocals and more of the dark shimmer that enveloped the duo's 2010 debut." At Rolling Stone, Jon Dolan rated the album three-and-a-half stars out of five, stating that the release "is at once sleek and world-weary, often homing in on that sexy moment of malaise when the Seventies wanted to turn into the Eighties so badly but didn't quite know how to do it yet." Kevin Liedel of Slant rated the album two out of five stars, cautioning that the album is a "yawner made by two artists whose impressive discography makes its failure that much more confounding."

However, Lachlan Vass at Puluche.com gave After the Disco a less than favorable review, saying "Mercer’s delivery is generally good, Danger Mouse’s production is generally tight, but it just never crosses that threshold into greatness, despite a few glimmers of that potential. Too often though, these glimmers are drowned out by mediocrity. This record just feels like it should’ve been better than it is." Puluche gave the album a 62.5 out of 100. Larry Fitzmaurice of Pitchfork echoed this sentiment, stating that "After the Disco is a more cohesive record, and that turns out to be the problem: Mercer and Burton's eccentricities have been sanded down to a single, flattened plane."

Track listing
All songs written by James Mercer and Brian Burton and produced by Burton.

Personnel
Adapted from After the Disco liner notes.

Broken Bells
Brian Burton – drums, organ, piano, synthesizer, percussion, bass, guitar
James Mercer – vocals, guitar, bass, organ, synthesizer, percussion

Vocals
Elizabeth Berg – backing vocals (tracks 3–5, 7, 9–11)
Heather Porcaro – backing vocals (tracks 3–5, 7, 9–11)
Myla Balugay – backing vocals (tracks 3–5, 7, 9–11)
Rebecca Ann Stark – backing vocals (tracks 3–5, 7, 9–11)

Orchestra
The Angel City String Orchestra – strings (tracks 4, 5, 7, 10, 11)
Daniele Luppi – conductor, string arrangement
Anton Riehl – score
Peter Kent – concertmaster, violin
Chris Tedesco – contractor

Carolyn Osborn – violin
Erika Walczak – violin
Jennifer Walton – violin
Judy Yoo – violin
Julie Beavers – violin
Norman Hughes – violin
Shari Zippert – violin
Sharon Jackson – violin
Susan Chatman – violin
Vladimir Polimatidi – violin

Alisha Bauer – cello
Stefanie Fife – cello
Vanessa Freebairn-Smith – cello
Adrianna Zoppo – viola
Brianna Bandy – viola
Jessica Van Velzen – viola

Additional musicians
Kamasi Washington – tenor saxophone (track 9)
David Ralicke – trombone (track 9)
Nathaniel Walcott – trumpet (track 9)

Technical personnel
Brian Burton – producer, programmer
Kennie Takahashi – programmer, mixing, recording, engineer
Todd Monfalcone – recording
Jeff Peters – string recording (tracks 4, 5, 7, 10, 11)
Jacob Dennis – assistant mixing, assistant engineer
Chris Kahn – assistant mixing, assistant engineer
Stephen Marcussen – mastering
Todd Monfalcone – mixing, second engineer
Geoff Neal – mixing assistance
Laura Sisk – second engineer
Jeremy Underwood – assistant engineer (strings)

Artistic personnel
Jacob Escobedo – artwork

Charts

Weekly charts

Year-end charts

Release history

References

External links
 
 Artwork

2014 albums
Albums produced by Danger Mouse (musician)
Broken Bells albums
Columbia Records albums
Space rock albums